General Cocke may refer to:

Erle Cocke Jr. (1921–2000), U.S. Army brigadier general
John Alexander Cocke (1772–1854), Tennessee Militia major general in the War of 1812
John Hartwell Cocke (1780–1866), Virginia Militia brigadier general in the War of 1812
Philip St. George Cocke (1809–1861), Confederate States Army brigadier general